The Trotskyist political party Lutte Ouvrière (Workers' Struggle), is a communist party in France named after the name of its weekly paper. Arlette Laguiller has been the party's spokeswoman since 1973 and ran in each presidential election until 2012, when Nathalie Arthaud was the candidate. Robert Barcia (Hardy) was its founder and central leader. Lutte Ouvrière is a member of the Internationalist Communist Union. It emphasises workplace activity and has been critical of such recent phenomena as alter-globalization.

History 
Its origins lie in the tiny Trotskyist Group founded in 1939 by David Korner (Barta). This developed factory work throughout the war and was instrumental in the Renault strike of 1947, along with the anarcho-syndicalists. The group was exhausted by this effort and collapsed in 1952.

After attempts to revive the Trotskyist Group, Voix Ouvrière was founded in 1956 by Robert Barcia, known as Hardy and the group's pre-eminent leader, and by Pierre Bois, a leading activist in the Renault plant. Effort was made to involve Barta but disputes between him, Hardy and Bois prevented it.

VO established itself through the 1960s by producing mass factory bulletins, usually weekly. The Communist Party of France (PCF) retained its hegemonic position within the workers' movement in France and its members sometimes tried to prevent the distribution of VO bulletins. In part this explains the continued use of semi-clandestine operation within VO and in LO today.

After being banned due to its support of the Students Revolt of May '68, the group became Lutte Ouvrière.

Since the 1970s 
An ongoing issue is the possibility and conditions of cooperation with fellow Trotskyist party the Revolutionary Communist League, the French section of the Fourth International. In 1970, LO initiated fusion discussions with the LC (as the LCR was then called). After extensive discussions, the two organisations had agreed the basis for a fused organisation. However, the fusion was not completed. In 1976 discussions between the Ligue and Lutte Ouvrière progressed again. The two organisations started to produce a common weekly supplement to their newspapers, common electoral work and other common campaigning. Since then on occasions the two organizations have stood joint candidates at some elections.

LO has made great efforts to stand in elections either on its own or in an alliance with the LCR. As a result, Arlette Laguiller has become well known to the public as LO's perennial presidential candidate. The early 1970s also saw two breakaways from Lutte Ouvrière. The first such split, in 1974 in Bordeaux, took the name l'Union Ouvrière, but rapidly disintegrated, so much so that when another small split group that developed a year later expected to be able to fuse with l'Union Ouvrière, it found it had already disappeared and were forced to form their own organisation as a consequence. This new group, Combat Communiste, evolved into Socialisme International, an affiliate of the International Socialist Tendency.

Another more recent breakaway developed after Arlette Laguiller's relatively high electoral results in the 1990s and LO's statement that this meant that a new workers' party was a possibility. This statement, as well as a dispute over the personal code members were expected to abide by, led to the departure of over a hundred members to form the Voix des Travailleurs group. This later fused with another smaller group but has more recently joined the Revolutionary Communist League as a recognised faction. In the period up to 2008, a minority faction existed within LO and appeared publicly, although its supporters were segregated in their own cells.

LO has gained critique for their position on the 2004 French law on secularity and conspicuous religious symbols in schools. André Victor written in his article Islamic Hijab and the Subjugation of Women 25 April 2003 that "Sarkozy has spoken out against hijab on passport photos, and presumably earned the approval of millions of voters, which was probably the real purpose of this exercise in demagoguery". It considers that "The real problem is that wearing the hijab, visible sign of the subjugation of women to their husband, father, brother or men in general, has been the subject of a political campaign of organizations present in fundamentalist migrant groups to impose their law within them, especially women. ... Therefore this policy leads to increase the weight of the most reactionary religious authorities within the immigrant population". While considering the law as hypocrite, LO stated that "For teachers, not accepting hijab, - particularly in the classroom, -  means to support women in their family and social environment, attempting to resist the machismo".

Following the very low score of Arlette Laguiller in the first round of the April–May 2007 presidential election (1,33%, compared to 5,72% in 2002), the party was left with a debt of 1,4 million Euros. According to Michel Rodinson, a party official, the campaign cost was in total 2 million Euros (800,000 of which are paid by the state). The rent of the Zenith for meetings in Paris, as well as the December political poster campaign, account for most of the expenses.

In the local elections in 2008, Lutte Ouvrière broke with tradition by joining the Socialist Party-led slates by the first round of the elections in a number of towns, preferring this tactic to the more usual option of cooperating with other far left groups to run a joint election campaign. Because an organized minority faction called "L'Étincelle" supported some lists running against lists supported by the party leadership, Lutte Ouvrière suspended the faction from the organization in February 2008; the faction was expelled in September 2008. The faction has agreed to take part in the initial stages of the New Anticapitalist Party set up by the LCR with others, though this may not be a long-term strategy, with one member explaining it as "foot in both camps" strategy.

Unlike in 2004 and 1999, when it ran common lists with the Revolutionary Communist League, LO ran autonomous lists in the 2009 European Parliament election in France. For the 2022 French legislative election, LO announced that the party would run its own slate separate from the New Ecologic and Social People's Union, which they believe to be reformist.

Fête de Lutte Ouvrière
Another very public activity of LO is their annual fête which is held in the grounds of a chateau which the organisation purchased for that purpose in 1981. The annual Fête de Lutte Ouvrière is probably the largest public gathering of the revolutionary left in Europe.

Leadership 

The 2012 presidential candidate, Nathalie Arthaud, is a teacher and was an elected town councillor for Vaulx-en-Velin, in charge of youth matters.  Arthaud was also the spokesperson for Arlette Laguiller's 2007 presidential campaign.  Arlette Laguiller had first run as the LO candidate in 1974, and subsequently in 1981, 1988, 1995, 2002, with 2007 being her last candidacy, and still plays an active part in the leadership of the party.  For long, the internal organisations of the party were largely unknown to the general public, the spokeswoman and regular presidential candidate Arlette Laguiller being the only party leader appearing in public. Even to party members, some leaders were known only by cadre names. The party justified such secrecy measures by the possibility that it may have to enter clandestinity, should a highly repressive government take power. For similar reasons, marriages and children were strongly discouraged.

Bernard Seytre, a member of LO for 20 years, confirmed the "iron discipline which rhythms the life of this Trotskyist organisation, whose responsibles [cadres] do not have the right to have children, lest they be excluded".

Lutte Ouvrière was criticised by political opponents in the 2002 presidential campaign as being a political cult, for example by Daniel Cohn-Bendit, his older brother Gabriel Cohn-Bendit, L'Humanité and Libération. In part, this strict disciplinary attitude has enabled LO to be a very stable organisation in contrast to the instability that they allege characterises so many other left groups. LO is a difficult organisation to actually join and after becoming a member, individuals are expected to conform to a code of conduct, which is considered old fashioned by some critics.

Election results

Presidential

International relations 
LO maintains relations with the following other Trotskyist groups (Internationalist Communist Union):

Workers' Fight (UK)
The Spark (United States)
 Guadeloupe and Martinique
Organisation Révolutionnaire des travailleurs Haïti
 (Africa)
Sınıf Mücadelesi (Turkey)
Lucha de Clase (Spain)
 L'Internazionale (Italy)
 Bund Revolutionärer Arbeiter (Germany)

See also
 International Workingmen's Association
 Arlette Laguiller
 Parti des Travailleurs

References

External links

Internationalist Communist Union site

1956 establishments in France
Communist parties in France
Internationalist Communist Union
Political parties established in 1956
Political parties of the French Fifth Republic
Trotskyist organizations in France
Socialist feminist organizations
Feminist parties